Hohenems-Dornbirn Airfield is a public aerodrome located  southwest of Dornbirn, Vorarlberg, Austria. It is used for general aviation as well as air police and air rescue operations.

See also
 Transport in Austria
 List of airports in Austria

References

External links 

 
 

Airports in Austria
Transport in Vorarlberg